The Clayton Cup is a trophy that was awarded by the Country Rugby League to the NSW country rugby league team with the best overall record for that season. To be eligible, the team must win the highest level of competition in its region. Usually the winner of the Clayton Cup goes through the season undefeated. In late 2019, the Country Rugby League was absorbed by the New South Wales Rugby League. 

The Cup was donated by Reub Clayton, an early rugby league administrator in country NSW. The cup was first awarded in 1937 to West Tamworth. Since then, the Tweed Heads Seagulls, Grafton Ghosts, North Tamworth Bears and Cobar Roosters have been the most successful clubs, each winning the trophy three times.

Winners

Sources

See also

Rugby league in New South Wales
 http://crlnsw.com.au/country-rugby-leagues-clayton-cup-oberon-saturday/ - List to 2013
 https://www.dailytelegraph.com.au/sport/nrl/bush-beat-prestigious-clayton-cup-to-be-presented-at-country-rugby-league-awards-night/news-story/bafe09665e0961e2bfecd7fea3193ba0 - Story on 2017 winners
 https://www.tweeddailynews.com.au/news/ziebell-and-raiders-take-out-top-country-league-go/3540117/ - Story on 2018 winners

References

External links

Rugby league competitions in New South Wales
1937 establishments in Australia
Sports leagues established in 1937